José Nieto may refer to:

 José Nieto (actor) (1902–1982), Spanish actor
 José Nieto (composer) (born 1942), Spanish composer
 José Nieto (footballer)
 José Manuel Nieto (1734–1804), Spanish soldier and settler of Spanish California